Hypocysta euphemia, the rock ringlet, is a species of butterfly of the family Nymphalidae. It is found in Australia, including southern Queensland, New South Wales and Victoria.

The wingspan is about 40 mm. Adults have brown wings with a complex pattern of darker lines and one large and one small eyespot on each wing. The underside of the wings is similar to the upperside, but the two eyespots are more equal in size.

The larvae feed on various Poaceae species. Young larvae are green with a black head. Later instars are brown with indistinct longitudinal lines and a brown head. Full-grown larvae are about 20 mm long. Pupation takes place in a black and spiky pupa.

References

Satyrini
Butterflies described in 1851